Occhipinti is a family name of Italian origin, specifically from the town of Ragusa, Sicily. 

It may refer to: 

 Joseph Occhipinti, Italian American retired Decorated Federal Agent, Author and Philanthropist
 Andrea Occhipinti, Italian  actor and producer
 Arianna Occhipinti, Italian winemaker and winery owner
 Leonardo Occhipinti, Italian footballer
 Maria Occhipinti, Italian anarcha-feminist
 Paolo Occhipinti, Italian singer and journalist

See also 
 Neufeld-Occhipinti Jazz Orchestra, Canadian jazz musical group 

Italian-language surnames